The 1915 Oregon Agricultural Aggies football team represented Oregon Agricultural College (now known as Oregon State University) as an independent during the 1915 college football season. In their third and final season under head coach E. J. Stewart, the Aggies compiled a 5–3 record were outscored by their opponents by a combined total of 166 to 73.  The team played its home games at Bell Field in Corvallis, Oregon. Gus Hofer was the team captain.

Schedule

References

Oregon Agricultural
Oregon State Beavers football seasons
Oregon Agricultural Aggies football